Donald Henry Pleasence  (5 October 1919 – 2 February 1995) was an English actor. He began his career on stage in the West End before transitioning into a screen career, where he played numerous supporting and character roles including RAF Flight Lieutenant Colin Blythe in The Great Escape (1963), the villain Ernst Stavro Blofeld in the James Bond film You Only Live Twice (1967), SEN 5241 in THX 1138 (1971), and the deranged Clarence "Doc" Tydon in Wake in Fright (1971).

Pleasence starred as psychiatrist Dr. Samuel Loomis in Halloween (1978) and four of its sequels, a role for which he was nominated for a Saturn Award for Best Actor. The series' popularity and critical success led to a resurgent career for Pleasence, who appeared in numerous American and European-produced horror and thriller films. He collaborated with Halloween director John Carpenter twice more, as the President of the United States in Escape from New York (1981), and as the Priest in Prince of Darkness (1987).

Early life
Pleasence was born in Worksop, Nottinghamshire, the son of Alice (née Armitage) and Thomas Stanley Pleasence, a railway station master. He was brought up as a strict Methodist in the small village of Grimoldby, Lincolnshire. He received his formal education at Crosby Junior School, Scunthorpe and Ecclesfield Grammar School near Sheffield, West Riding of Yorkshire. After working as the clerk-in-charge at Swinton railway station, he decided that he wanted to be a professional actor, taking up a placement with the Jersey Repertory Company in 1939.

Second World War
In December 1939, Pleasence initially refused conscription into the British Armed Forces, registering as a conscientious objector, but changed his stance in autumn 1940, after the attacks upon London by the Luftwaffe, and volunteered with the Royal Air Force. He served as aircraft wireless-operator with No. 166 Squadron in Bomber Command, with which he flew almost sixty raids against the Axis over occupied Europe.

On 31 August 1944, his Lancaster NE112 was shot down during an attack on Agenville, and he was captured and imprisoned in the German prisoner-of-war camp Stalag Luft I. Pleasence produced and acted in many plays for the entertainment of his fellow captives.

After the war and his release, he was discharged from the RAF in 1946.

Acting career
Returning to acting after the war, Pleasence resumed working in repertory theatre companies in Birmingham and Bristol. In the 1950s, Pleasence's stage work included performing as Willie Mossop in a 1952 production of Hobson's Choice at the Arts Theatre, London and as Dauphin in Jean Anouilh's The Lark (1956). In 1960, Pleasence gained excellent notices as the tramp in Harold Pinter's The Caretaker at the Arts Theatre, a role he would again play in a 1990 revival. Other stage work in the 1960s included Anouilh's Poor Bitos (1963–64) and Robert Shaw's The Man in the Glass Booth (1967), for which he won the London Variety Award for Stage Actor of the Year in 1968. Pleasence's later stage work included performing in a double bill of Pinter plays, The Basement and Tea Party, at the Duchess Theatre in 1970.

Television
Pleasence made his television debut in I Want to Be a Doctor (1946). He received positive critical attention for his role as Syme in the BBC version of Nineteen Eighty-Four (1954) from the novel by George Orwell. The adaptation was by Nigel Kneale and featured Peter Cushing in the lead role of Winston Smith.

Pleasence played Prince John in several episodes of the ITV series The Adventures of Robin Hood (1956–1958). He appeared twice with Patrick McGoohan in the British spy series, Danger Man, in episodes "Position of Trust" (1960) and "Find and Return" (1961). Pleasence's first appearance in America was in an episode of The Twilight Zone, playing an aging teacher at a boys' school in the episode "The Changing of the Guard" (1962). In 1963, he appeared in an episode of The Outer Limits titled "The Man with the Power". In 1966, he also guest starred in an episode of The Fugitive entitled "With Strings Attached."

In 1973, Pleasence played a sympathetic murderer in an episode of Columbo entitled "Any Old Port in a Storm". Also that year, he played a supporting role in David Winters' musical television adaptation of Dr. Jekyll and Mr. Hyde.

He also portrayed a murderer captured by Mrs. Columbo in "Murder Is a Parlor Game" (1979). In 1978, he played a scout, Sam Purchas in an adaptation of James A. Michener's Centennial. Pleasence starred as the Reverend Septimus Harding in the BBC's TV series The Barchester Chronicles (1982). In this series, his daughter Angela Pleasence played his onscreen daughter Susan.

He hosted the 1981 Halloween episode of Saturday Night Live with music guest Fear.

In 1986, Pleasence joined Ronald Lacey and Polly Jo Pleasence for the television thriller Into the Darkness.

Pleasence and Michael Nader portrayed the villains in 1988's The Great Escape II: The Untold Story, which costar Christopher Reeve explained as not being a remake of the 1963 original film and being based on Paul Brickhill’s novel The Great Escape. Noting his involvement in the original film, Joan Hanauer wrote that Pleasence had “graduated to an S.S. villain, and he is a marvel of soft-spoken, almost finicky evil.”

Film

Pleasence made his big-screen debut with The Beachcomber (1954). Some notable early roles include Parsons in 1984 (1956), and minor roles opposite Alec Guinness in Barnacle Bill (1957) and Dirk Bogarde in The Wind Cannot Read (1958). In Tony Richardson's film of Look Back in Anger (1959), he plays a vindictive market inspector opposite Richard Burton. In the same year, Pleasence starred in the horror films Circus of Horrors directed by Sidney Hayers, playing the role of Vanet, the owner of a circus, and The Flesh and the Fiends as the real-life murderer William Hare, alongside Peter Cushing, George Rose and Billie Whitelaw.

Endowed with a bald head, a penetrating stare, and an intense voice, usually quiet but capable of a piercing scream, he specialised in portraying insane, fanatical, or evil characters, including the title role in Dr Crippen (1962), the frontier prophet Oracle Jones in Hallelujah Trail, the double agent Dr Michaels in the science-fiction film Fantastic Voyage (1966), the white trader who sells guns to the Cheyenne Indians in the revisionist western Soldier Blue (1970), the mad German psychoanalyst with Bud Spencer–Terence Hill in  Watch Out, We're Mad! (1974), Nazi leader Heinrich Himmler in The Eagle Has Landed (1976), and the Bond arch-villain Ernst Stavro Blofeld in You Only Live Twice (1967), the first film in which Blofeld's face is clearly seen. His interpretation of the character has become predominant in popular culture considering the popularity of the comic villain, Dr. Evil in the successful Austin Powers film series, which primarily parodies it. In the crime drama Hell is a City (1960), shot in Manchester, he starred opposite Stanley Baker, while he was memorably cast in the horror comedy What a Carve Up! (1961) as the “horrible-looking zombie” solicitor opposite Shirley Eaton, Sid James, Kenneth Connor and Dennis Price.

He appeared as the mild-mannered and good-natured POW forger Colin Blythe in the film The Great Escape (1963), who discovers that he is slowly going blind, but nonetheless participates in the mass break-out, only to be shot down by German soldiers because he is unable to see them. Variety highlighted Pleasence and Richard Attenborough as giving some of the better performances in the film, Pleasence specifically being praised for having the most moving portrayal and depicting "the film’s most touching character." In The Night of the Generals (1967), he played another uncharacteristically sympathetic role, this time as an old-school German general involved in a plot to kill Adolf Hitler. In 1971, he returned to the realm of the deranged, delivering a tour de force performance in the role of an alcoholic Australian doctor in Ted Kotcheff's nightmarish outback drama Wake in Fright.

Pleasence played Lucifer in the religious epic The Greatest Story Ever Told (1965). He was one of many stars who were given cameos throughout the film.

He also acted in Roman Polanski's Cul-de-sac (1966), in which he portrayed the love-sodden husband of a much younger French wife (Françoise Dorléac). He ventured successfully into American cowboy territory, playing a sadistic self-styled preacher who goes after stoic Charlton Heston in the Western Will Penny (1968).

He portrayed SEN 5241 in THX 1138 (1971), opposite Robert Duvall which was the directorial debut of George Lucas. The next year he appeared as an eccentric, tea-obsessed police inspector in the cult horror film Death Line alongside Norman Rossington and Christopher Lee.  A few years later, he portrayed antagonist Lucas Deranian, in Walt Disney's Escape to Witch Mountain (1975) and, in Telefon (1977), Nicolai Dalchimsky, the Russian seeking to start a war between the United States and the Soviet Union.

Pleasence appeared as Dr. Samuel Loomis in John Carpenter's horror film Halloween (1978). The film was a major success and was considered the highest grossing independent film of its time, earning accolades as a classic of the horror genre. He also played the teacher, Kantorek in All Quiet on the Western Front (1979), Dr. Kobras in The Pumaman (1980) and the held-hostage President of the United States in Escape from New York (1981). The rather sinister accent which Pleasence employed in this and other films may be credited to the elocution lessons he had as a child. He reprised his Dr. Sam Loomis role in Halloween II (1981), Halloween 4: The Return of Michael Myers (1988), Halloween 5: The Revenge of Michael Myers (1989) and Halloween: The Curse of Michael Myers (1995).

Pleasence, Daria Nicolodi, and Jennifer Connelly starred in Dario Argento's Phenomena (1985), where Pleasence portrayed a wheelchair using forensic entomologist. Although Austin Trunick of Under the Radar criticized Connelly for not being an active heroine, he cited "a lot of nice interaction between Connelly and Pleasence’s eccentric character" as a positive tradeoff. Later that year, Pleasence played a retiring inspector who investigates the disappearance of the sister of Tom Schanley's character in Nothing Underneath.
JA Kerswell called Pleasence's role "clichéd" for the actor while also praising his presence as "a welcome bonus." The reviewer from Horror Society wrote of liking Schanley and Pleasence "but the story is the main focus here and not the cast which is a bit of a shame because both did fantastic jobs." Operation Nam was Pleasence's sole film appearance in 1986, playing "a minor part as a priest" who services Vietnam soldiers.

Pleasence collaborated with Carpenter again when he starred in Prince of Darkness (1987), where he played a priest who seeks the aid of a professor and a few of the latter's quantum physics students to uncover the mystery of a glowing liquid in a canister. Though mixed about the film, Starburst praised Pleasence's performance, admitting that to them, "there are very few sights in genre cinema as marvelous as seeing Pleasence delivering an intense, slightly erratic monologue, and he gets plenty to sink his teeth into here." Megan Summers asserted that Pleasence brought "his standard emotional prowess and psychological stability to his role" in the film, and Michael Wilmington declared Pleasence and Victor Wong as "both fine; these two know how to make the most of shallow excess."

Pleasence admired Sir Laurence Olivier, with whom he worked on-stage in the 1950s, and later on the film version of Dracula (1979). Two years earlier, Pleasence did an amusingly broad impersonation of Olivier in the guise of a horror-film actor called "Valentine De'ath" in the film The Uncanny (1977). According to the film critic Kim Newman on a DVD commentary for Halloween II, the reason for Pleasence's lengthy filmography was that he never turned down any role that was offered.

Spoken records and voice-overs
During the early 1960s, Pleasence recorded several children's-story records on the Atlas Record label. These were marketed as the Talespinners series in the United Kingdom. They were also released in the United States as Tale Spinners for Children by United Artists. The stories included Don Quixote and the Brave Little Tailor.

Pleasence provided the voice-over for the British public information film, The Spirit of Dark and Lonely Water (1973). The film, intended to warn children of the dangers of playing near water, attained notoriety for allegedly giving children nightmares.

Books
Pleasence was the author of the children's book Scouse the Mouse (1977) (London: New English Library), which was animated by Canadian animator/film director Gerald Potterton (a friend of the actor, who directed him in the Canadian film The Rainbow Boys (1973), retitled The Rainbow Gang for VHS release in the United States) and also adapted into a children's recording (Polydor Records, 1977) with Ringo Starr voicing the book's title character, Scouse the Mouse.

In his book British Film Character Actors (1982), Terence Pettigrew describes Pleasence as "a potent combination of eyes and voice. The eyes are mournful but they can also be sinister or seedy or just plain nutty. He has the kind of piercing stare which lifts enamel off saucepans."

Awards
Pleasence was nominated four times for the Tony Award for best performance by a leading actor in a Broadway play: in 1962 for Harold Pinter's The Caretaker, in 1965 for Jean Anouilh's Poor Bitos, in 1969 for Robert Shaw's The Man in the Glass Booth, and in 1972 for Simon Gray's Wise Child.

Pleasence was appointed an Officer of the Most Excellent Order of the British Empire for his services to the acting profession by Queen Elizabeth II in 1994.

Personal life
Pleasence married four times and had five daughters from his first three marriages. He had Angela and Jean with Miriam Raymond (m. 1941–1958); Lucy and Polly with Josephine Martin Crombie (m. 1959–1970); and Miranda with Meira Shore (m. 1970–1988). His last marriage was to Linda Kentwood (m. 1988–1995; his death).

Death
On 2 February 1995, Pleasence died at age 75 in Saint-Paul-de-Vence, France, from complications of heart failure following heart valve replacement surgery. His body was cremated.

Legacy
The 1995 film Halloween: The Curse of Michael Myers was dedicated to Donald Pleasence. The 1998 film Halloween H20: 20 Years Later also features a dedication to Pleasence in the end credits, with voice actor Tom Kane providing a voice-over for Loomis in the film. In the 2018 film, Halloween, comedian Colin Mahan voiced Loomis. In the 2021 film Halloween Kills Tom Jones, Jr. played Loomis, wearing prosthetic make-up to resemble Pleasence. Loomis' voice was again provided by Mahan.

Dr. Evil, the character played by Mike Myers in the Austin Powers comedy films (1997–2002), and Doctor Claw from Inspector Gadget are parodies of Pleasence's performance as Blofeld in You Only Live Twice.

Filmography

Film

Television

References

External links

 
 
 
 
 Donald Pleasence at screenonline
 Donald Pleasence-bio at (re)Search my Trash
 The Man with the Hypnotic Eye A Tribute to Donald Pleasence
 Photograph of a theatrical production in prisoner of war camp featuring Donald Pleasence
 
 A Tribute to Donald Pleasence

1919 births
1995 deaths
20th-century English male actors
Best Actor BAFTA Award (television) winners
British expatriates in France
British World War II prisoners of war
English conscientious objectors
English male film actors
English male stage actors
English male television actors
English male voice actors
English Methodists
Officers of the Order of the British Empire
People educated at Ecclesfield Grammar School
People from Worksop
Royal Air Force airmen
Royal Air Force personnel of World War II
Shot-down aviators
World War II prisoners of war held by Germany